Masoud Mikaeili (born 5 February 1987) is an Iranian footballer who plays for Sepidrood in the Iran Football's 2nd Division.

Club career
Mikaeili started his career with Pegah Gilan F.C. In summer 2012 he joined newly promoted, Paykan.

Club career statistics

References

External links
Profile at Persianleague.com

1987 births
Living people
Damash Gilan players
Pas players
Paykan F.C. players
Iranian footballers
Association football central defenders
People from Rasht
Sportspeople from Gilan province